Saulyashbash (Säwäläşbaş) is a rural locality (a village) in Kaltasinsky Selsoviet, Kaltasinsky District, Bashkortostan, Russia. The population was 21 as of 2010. There is 1 street.

Geography 
Saulyashbash is located 7 km northeast of Kaltasy (the district's administrative centre) by road. Kalmash is the nearest rural locality.

References 

Rural localities in Kaltasinsky District